Wushu was contested by both men and women at the 1993 East Asian Games in Shanghai, China from May 14 to 16, 1993.

Medalists

Men

Women

Medal table

References 

Wushu at the East Asian Games
1993 East Asian Games
Wushu competitions in China
1993 in wushu (sport)